Juan Antonio Marín Casero (born 2 March 1975) is a former professional male tennis player from Costa Rica.

He originally played on tour under the Spanish flag, as he was born to a father from Murcia and a mother from Asturias, and lived in Spain since the age of 14. However, in May 1998 he began representing Costa Rica.

In October 1999, Marín reached his career-high singles ranking of world No. 55. Previously that year he came close to beating the then-world No. 2 Pete Sampras at the 1999 French Open, with the American eventually winning 6–7, 6–4, 7–5, 6–7, 6–4. He never won a Grand Slam main draw match, despite appearing in 17.

ATP career finals

Singles: 2 (1 title, 1 runner-up)

ATP Challenger and ITF Futures finals

Singles: 13 (5–8)

Doubles: 3 (1–2)

Performance timeline

Singles

References

External links
 
 

1975 births
Living people
Spanish male tennis players
Costa Rican male tennis players
Costa Rican expatriate sportspeople in Spain
Olympic tennis players of Costa Rica
Sportspeople from San José, Costa Rica
Tennis players at the 2000 Summer Olympics